Robert John Carmody (September 4, 1938 – October 27, 1967) was an American boxer whose career, which had included a bronze medal at the 1964 Summer Olympics in Tokyo as part of the flyweight division, was cut short when he was killed in action serving with the United States Army in the Vietnam War.

Early life
Born  in 1938 to lower-class parents in Brooklyn, Carmody learned his trade in street fights near his home before joining the Army in 1957 and signing up for boxing classes with a close friend.

Amateur career
Carmody proved a natural, and was quickly chosen to represent the 11th Airborne Division, continuing in this position after their deployment to Germany in 1958. In 1961, Carmody won his first All-Army flyweight boxing title, retaining it for the next four years until 1965. He also won the International Military Sports Council title in 1962 and garnered a bronze at the 1963 Pan American Games.

Attending the Olympic trials at the 1964 New York World's Fair the following year, Carmody won a shock victory over the favored Melvin Miller to secure a place on the 1964 Olympic team. At the training camp, Carmody formed a close friendship with Joe Frazier, at one point reportedly talking Frazier out of quitting the sport following an unexpected defeat. At the Olympics Carmody suffered a bruised hand, but still beat the Nepalese Thapa Namsing and the German Otto Babiasch before losing in the semi-finals to the eventual winner Fernando Atzori, thus claiming a bronze medal.

1964 Olympic results
 Round of 32: bye
 Round of 16: Defeated Nam Singh Thapa (Nepal) RSC
 Quarterfinal: Defeated Otto Babiasch (Unified Team of Germany) 4–1
 Semifinal: Lost to Fernando Atzori (Italy) 1–4 (was awarded bronze medal)

Outside the ring
After the Olympics, Carmody met and married Merry Sykes in Germany, and the two settled down into army family life, Robert and Merry had two children, Terri, a daughter 2 years old at the time of his death in Vietnam, and his newborn son, Robert Jr. 
After the Olympics and before Vietnam, Carmody trained several boxing teams at the International Military Sports Council games, including the U.S. Army squad and the Iraqi army boxing team.
Carmody was given a pass to opt out of serving in Vietnam.  He was a trained Army Boxer and not a well trained Soldier. 
Nevertheless, He decided to serve with his platoon and at the young age of 27 paid the ultimate price for his service.<Terri Carmody DeAntonio: His daughter>

Death
In June 1967 Carmody was called up to go to Vietnam with his unit, D Troop of the U.S. 17th Cavalry Regiment. Despite pleas from his friends not to go as he was not sufficiently combat trained as a result of his boxing career, Carmody insisted on deploying with his unit. Several weeks after arriving, while on a routine six-man foot patrol just to the north of Saigon, Viet Cong guerillas ambushed the squad and killed five of the six men, the single survivor reaching safety after an arduous journey of eleven hours. Among the dead was Staff Sergeant Carmody, who was posthumously awarded the Bronze Star for his valor during the ambush. Many tributes were offered following his death from soldiers and sportsmen alike who had known and respected him during his career.

References
ESPN Web Biography
Memorial at the Vietnam Virtual Wall
sports-reference

1938 births
1967 deaths
Sportspeople from Brooklyn
Flyweight boxers
Boxers from New York City
Olympic bronze medalists for the United States in boxing
Boxers at the 1964 Summer Olympics
American military personnel killed in the Vietnam War
United States Army non-commissioned officers
American male boxers
Medalists at the 1964 Summer Olympics
Boxers at the 1963 Pan American Games
Pan American Games bronze medalists for the United States
Pan American Games medalists in boxing
Medalists at the 1963 Pan American Games
United States Army personnel of the Vietnam War
Olympians killed in warfare